Sangeli is a village in South Konkan Region in the Indian state of Maharashtra.

It is famous for its cool environment and Girijanath Temple. The yearly festival of Girijanath falls one day before holi which is a Hindu Spring Festival. On the Girijanath Festival one Jackfruit tree is cut and carved in the cylinder shape. And that cylinder shaped shoulder pole is carried out by the people. When they reach Girijanath Temple they remove old pole and the new pole is kept. And the old one is kept with the old ones. If we count those poles before keeping the pole they are 21 and after keeping the pole they are 21. Sangeli people think that one pole goes to Kashi.

Sageli village is connected by a bus route from Sawantwadi in Sindhudurg district, which has better transport connectivity from nearby city like Panjim, Mumbai or Pune.

Villages in Sindhudurg district